Palau participated at the 2018 Summer Youth Olympics in Buenos Aires, Argentina from 6 October to 18 October 2018.

Swimming

Boys

Girls

References

Youth
Nations at the 2018 Summer Youth Olympics
Palau at the Youth Olympics